United States gubernatorial elections were held in 1804, in 13 states, concurrent with the House, Senate elections and presidential election.

Eight governors were elected by popular vote and five were elected by state legislatures.

Results

See also 
1804 United States elections
1804 United States presidential election
1804–05 United States Senate elections
1804–05 United States House of Representatives elections

References

Notes

Bibliography